LAC-IX is an association of Internet exchange points in Latin American and Caribbean. LAC-IX is also part of the global IX-F Internet eXchange Federation.

See also
List of Internet exchange points

References

External links
 Official website

Internet exchange points in Latin America
Internet exchange points in the Caribbean
Internet-related organizations
Latin America and the Caribbean